Tony Fisher may refer to:

 Tony Fisher (American football) (born 1979), American football player
 Tony Fisher (rugby), British rugby footballer
 Tony Fisher (sailor) (born 1927), Australian sailor
 Big Tony Fisher, bassist for American funk band Trouble Funk
 Tony Fisher (puzzle designer), British puzzle designer

See also 
 Toni Fisher (1924–1999), American pop singer
 Anthony Fisher (disambiguation)